WAAX (570 AM) is a radio station broadcasting a news/talk/sports format. Licensed to Gadsden, Alabama, United States, the station is currently owned by San Antonio-based iHeartMedia. Overnight, the station broadcasts the syndicated Coast to Coast AM hosted by George Noory.

Morning talk show host Dave Mack is a frequent guest/commentator on Nancy Grace's weeknight talk show on HLN.

History

The station began operation in 1947 as WGWD, also at 570 on the dial, but with a power of 1,000 watts, daytime only. WGWD was owned by the Covington family of Montgomery, Alabama. In its early days the station operated from studios located in the original Pioneer Life Insurance building in downtown Gadsden.

In 1955, the station was bought by Atlanta broadcaster Charles A. Smithgall, who had enjoyed great success on WSB in that city. Smithgall changed the calls to WCAS, raised the power level to 5,000 watts in 1959 and continued to operate the station status quo until 1960. By then the radio business in Gadsden had grown to such a level as another full-time station was needed. Smithgall hired Calvin Williamson to install a three tower directional array on what was a cow pasture on Rainbow Drive, just north of the Gadsden Country Clubs' golf course. In later years this would prove a great location, as the city grew south, traveling down Rainbow Drive. In the process, he also changed the call letters to WAAX. The location and set-up of the towers proved sufficient to put the signal into Georgia and Tennessee.

The new WAAX became a CBS affiliate, and programmed light pop music during the day, and ran a list of CBS programs at night. In 1962, Mike McDougald of Georgia, also a WSB alum, bought into the station, and became its general manager. McDougald continued the light pop sound during the day, but hired a young Mike Morelock to become the night time top 40 jock on "BIG WAAX". In the months to come, the station gained the image as the news leader, as McDougald outfitted the station vehicle with police and fire radios, and installed one of the first "car phones" in the area, actually a two-way radio that could call any telephone number from the road.

From the late 1950s through early 1963, Robert Allen Chumley Sr. was the news reporter, air-time salesman, and later on, night-time classical music host for WAAX. At the time of this change, the music schedule was Country music in the morning and Top 40 in the afternoon, with Classical music being added for Sunday nights. He covered various events such as shopping center openings, horse shows, etc. But the main ongoing agenda was the Civil Rights Movement where he covered church civil-rights meetings, KKK rallies, and protests, and interviewed such notables as Martin Luther King Jr., Ralph Abernathy, Marlon Brando, Harry Belafonte, and others for the station. These two antagonistic groups, the segregationists and integrationists alike, respected Chumley, and by virtue WAAX, for thorough and impartial news reporting. There were also threats from extremists on both sides by phone as well as automobile. Such was the atmosphere that Bob, as people called him, operated within as he was sent by the station to Montgomery to cover such events as the gubernatorial polls with a focus on George C. Wallace (who in 1958 ran on an education platform against segregationist John Malcolm Patterson and had the endorsement of the NAACP in that race) Due to such assignments in Gadsden and abroad, WAAX gained recognition with national news organizations through Bob’s coverage of such national issues as well as his association with Clancy Lake of WAPI in Birmingham as well as with those of WSFA television in Montgomery. Mike McDougald was very supportive of his staff during this period; such as when Chumley covered the showing of the movie To Kill A Mockingbird. Bob Chumley, by his and his wife’s own record collection, brought Gadsden a refined program of the arts through a far-sighted incorporation of high art into the general format of a top 40/news station. Such was the open mindedness of Mike McDougald, who allowed his staff to flex their own creativeness and idiosyncrasies which gave WAAX its prestige. Bob gave his news style and Classical music; Mike Morelock, his love of Rock and riding motorcycles wearing a German army helmet; and Mike McDougald, his sense of humor (as with his beebee rifle in the corner for the station's protection) as well as his concern for and support of his staff.

In 1973, Dave Fitz came to WAAX as Executive News Director. Quickly he became the news authority for the region. Fitz remained with WAAX for 25 years. With his easily recognizable voice and no-nonsense delivery, Fitz was regarded as the radio news guy in Gadsden for over 30 years (Fitz died on August 9, 2009)

The station gained popularity and in 1967 programmed modern country while still playing top 40 at night. With a booming signal, the station slogan became, BIG WAAX, the station you hear, everywhere. When FM became the dominant force for music on the radio, WAAX became and remains a news-talk station to this day.

In 1998, Program Director Bill Seckbach and GM Kathy Boggs brought the sounds of Rush Limbaugh, Paul Finebaum, and J. Holland to the "Big WAAX".

References

External links

AAX
News and talk radio stations in the United States
Radio stations established in 1947
Gadsden, Alabama
1947 establishments in Alabama
IHeartMedia radio stations